Eoin Price (born 1988 in Clonkill, County Westmeath) is an Irish sportsperson.  He plays hurling with his local club Clonkill and was a member of the Westmeath senior inter-county team from 2007 until 2020.

References

1988 births
Living people
Clonkill hurlers
Westmeath inter-county hurlers